Pouteria macrocarpa is a species of plant in the family Sapotaceae. It is found in Brazil, Colombia, and Costa Rica.

References

macrocarpa
Vulnerable plants
Taxonomy articles created by Polbot